The 1995–96 Georgia Bulldogs basketball team represented the University of Georgia as a member of the Southeastern Conference during the 1995–96 NCAA men's basketball season. The team was led by head coach Tubby Smith, and played their home games at Stegeman Coliseum in Athens, Georgia. The Bulldogs finished 6th during the SEC Regular season, and received an at-large bid to the NCAA tournament as No. 8 seed in the West region. They defeated No. 9 seed Clemson and No. 1 seed Purdue to reach the Sweet Sixteen. The Bulldogs fell to Syracuse, the eventual National runner-up, to finish the season at 21–10 (9–7 SEC).

Roster

Schedule and results

|-
!colspan=9 style=| Non-conference Regular season

|-
!colspan=9 style=| SEC Regular season

|-
!colspan=9 style=| SEC Tournament

|-
!colspan=9 style=| NCAA Tournament

Rankings

References

Georgia Bulldogs basketball seasons
Georgia
Georgia
Georgia Bulldogs
Georgia Bulldogs